Hartley Wespall is a civil parish in the Basingstoke and Deane district of Hampshire, England. It is near the larger village of Hook, which lies approximately 2.5 miles (4.1 km) south-west from the hamlet.

St.Mary Church is flint with a Tile hung North Tower. It was essentially reconstructed by Gilbert Scott in 1868–69. It still has, as noted by Pevsner “one tremendous original feature, the early C14 timbers of the West Wall.” The fourteenth century church is Grade I listed.

John Keate, headmaster of Eton College from 1809 to 1834, was made rector here in 1824. He is buried in the church.

References

External links 

Villages in Hampshire
Civil parishes in Basingstoke and Deane